Deshmanya Deshabandu Jeewaka Lalith Bhupendra Kotelawala is a Sri Lankan businessman, who was the chairman of Ceylinco Consolidated and also was the founding chairman of Seylan Bank. He was listed in 2007 Sri Lanka Richest List. He was remanded for the misappropriation of 26 billion rupees of investments from the failed Golden Key Credit Company.

Early life and education
Born to Senator Justin Kotelawala a Ceylonese politician and businessman and Millicent Kotelawala nee de Silva, daughter of Sir Arthur Marcelles de Silva, a leading surgeon. He was educated at Royal College, Colombo and studied chartered accountancy in the UK. He is the nephew of Sir John Kotelawala, the third Prime Minister of Ceylon.

Career
Taking over Ceylinco Consolidated from his father in the 1960s, Kotelawala expanded the group into new fields including banking, non-banking finance, investment banking, housing and property development, travel and leisure, communication & information technology, education and healthcare and, more recently, microfinance. He also founded a peace initiative in Sri Lanka, three years after being wounded in an LTTE attack in 1996.

Awards and honors
Kotelawala was awarded an Honorary Degree as Doctor of Philosophy by the University of Sri Jayewardenepura
He had been awarded the title Deshmanya by the Government of Sri Lanka.
Fellow of the Chartered Management Institute
Honorary Fellow of the Institute of Bankers

Personal life
Lalith is married to Sicille Kotelawala (née Fernando) a daughter of Sam Peter Christopher Fernando

References

Sinhalese businesspeople
Sri Lankan Christians
Converts to Christianity
Alumni of Royal College, Colombo
Living people
Sri Lankan terrorism victims
Prisoners and detainees of Sri Lanka
Sri Lankan prisoners and detainees
Sri Lankan criminals
Sri Lankan fraudsters
1938 births
Deshamanya